The following is a list of common fish species known to occur in the lakes and rivers of Canada.

List

References

Fish of North America
Canada
Canada